Manbij District is a district of Aleppo Governorate in northern Syria. The administrative centre is the city of Manbij. At the 2004 census, the district had a population of 408,143.

A 2019 report has estimated the population of Manbij district at 450,000 with 80% of the population being Arab, 15% Kurdish and 5% Turkmen and Circassian.

Sub-districts
The district of Manbij is divided into five subdistricts or nawāḥī (population as of 2004):

The Abu Kahf Subdistrict was separated from the Manbij Subdistrict in 2009.

References

 
Districts of Aleppo Governorate